The Santo Antão North (Zone) Opening Tournament (Portuguese: Torneio de Abertura de Zona Norte de Santo Antão, Capeverdean Crioulo, ALUPEC or ALUPEK: Turnéu di Abertura di Zona Sul di Santo Anton) was an opening tournament. (equivalent to a league cup) played during the season in the northern part of Santo Antão Island (consisting of the municipalities of Paul and Ribeira Grande, Cape Verde.  The opening tournament was organized by the Santo Antão North Regional Football Association (ARFNSA).

History
The first competition was held in 2003 and had only a single division until 2012.  After the creation of the second division in 2013, for three seasons, it also had the Second Division tournament and were the only two that had, the other being the São Vicente Association Cup.

Until 2009, it featured 9 rounds and the club met once.  When the second division was introduced to the São Vicente Island League in 2009, the Opening Tournament became the Association Cup and featured two divisions.  It currently consists of seven rounds, a meeting with another club once.  The winner with the most points is the winner.

Some people thought that the  opening tournament tended its competitions in 2015 as the Santo Antão Cup was revived in late 2015 and earlier in 2014, the creation of the Paul and Ribeira Grande local tournaments lead to the elimination of the opening tournament.  Also that year, its opening tournament competitions was thought to be eliminated in the island's South Zone.  It was not held due to scheduling concerns partly with the single island cup competitions

Title history
Solpontense was the first winner of the opening tournament won in 2000.  Paulense was the second winner in 2003, Os Foguetões won two straight titles in 2005, Paulense won their second title in 2006, Beira-Mar won their only title in 2007, Paulense won their third in 2008, Os Foguetões won their last title in 2009, Rosariense won their only title in 2011, Paulense won three consecutive titles in 2014, Sinagoga was the last winner won in 2015.

Paulense won the most titles numbering six, Foguetões is second with three and Solpontense, Beira-Mar, Rosariense and Sinagoga with a title each.  Approximately 40% of the titles won was Paulense, about 20% by Foguetoes.

Winners

Premier Division

Performance By Club

Performance by municipality

See also
Santo Antão North Premier Division
Santo Antão North Cup
Sports in Santo Antão, Cape Verde

Notes

References

Sport in Santo Antão, Cape Verde
Football cup competitions in Cape Verde
1999 establishments in Cape Verde
Recurring sporting events established in 1999